The phrase symmetry group may refer to:
symmetry group, the automorphisms of a mathematical object.
symmetry in physics, symmetry groups which describe physical properties of particles and forces.
symmetries of differential equations which form a Lie Group.

See also
 Rotation (disambiguation)
 Symmetric group